Ahmed Ibrahim Khalaf Al-Qafaje  (born 25 February 1992), known as Ahmed Ibrahim, is an Iraqi professional footballer who plays for Erbil and the Iraqi national team. He plays as a centre back.

Club career
Ahmed Ibrahim Khalaf Al-Qafaje was born in Al-Qayyarah in Nineveh Province, some 75 km south of the city of Mosul. Ahmed starred for his local team Al-Qayyarah SC playing in defence and sometimes in midfield and was paid a handsome fee to turn out for the side. With no top division club in his home province, Ahmed moved to Al-Sharqat where he started his top flight career before he was signed by Salahddin and then Erbil, a move which opened the door for his international debut in 2010. Only two years after playing local football in Al-Qayyarah, Ahmed was lining up as a starter for the Iraqi national team against India in Sharjah and went onto be named in the 2011 Asian Cup squad.

Youth career
Ibrahim started his career at Al-Shirqat before moving to Salahddin in 2008.

Arbil FC
In 2009, at the age of 17, Ahmed, along with teammate Karrie Tariq, went to DFrbil  on a one-year contract which was worth 60m Iraqi Dinars. Other than his short stint at Al Wasl, Ahmad remained at Erbil for 5 years until 2014.

Loan to Al Wasl
In January 2013, he signed a six-month loan deal with Emarati side Al-Wasl, who he remained with until the end of the 2012/13 season. He made 12 appearances for the club and returned to Arbil in the summer of 2013.

Ajman
In the summer of 2014, Ahmed left Arbil to sign for Emariti club Ajman. He spent the season at Ajman making 29 league appearances and proving himself to be one of their key players.

Al Dhafra
After just one season at Ajman, Ahmed signed for another team in the U.A.E., Al Dhafra, on a six-month deal which expired on the first of January 2016. He made 13 appearances for the side before he left at the start of 2016. After leaving Al Dhafra, he was a free agent for the remainder of the season.

Al Shorta
Following the Olympic games in Rio, Ahmed announced his return to the Iraqi Premier League by signing for Al Shorta but a clause in his contract stated that if an offer came in from a foreign club, he would be allowed to leave. Ahmed never ended up playing for Al Shorta as the clause was triggered.

Emirates Club
Emirates Club, another side in the U.A.E., activated that clause and Ahmed moved back to the U.A.E. to spend the 2016/17 season with Emirates. He signed for them on 27 September 2016 and made 11 appearances, scoring one goal. The team finished in 11th place, avoiding relegation by one point. The player was free to move after the season, since his contract ran out.

El Ettifaq 
on 27 June 2017, Ahmed signed a one-year contract with an option to extend. He made his debut against Al Ahli in the first round of 2017–18 Saudi Professional League on August 11, he provided an assist in the 2–1 win.

International career

Iraq National Team
Ahmed is an established international for Iraq having already played nearly 65 matches for the national team before his 25th birthday. He is on track to become one of Iraq's most capped players and is a very important figure for the national team, being the first choice centre back. On November 11, 2010, Ahmed made his debut against India. Iraq won that match 2–0. He was brought into the squad at the last minute by coach Wolfgang Sidka replacing the injured Hussein Abdul Wahid and remained with the side ever since. On March 28, 2015, on his 50th cap, Ahmed scored his first goal for his country heading in from a corner by Yaser Kasim in a friendly match against DR Congo in the UAE. On March 28, 2017, in a World Cup qualifier against Saudi Arabia, Ahmed produced a world class goal line clearance which kept Iraq in the game. The clearance gained a lot of attention online.

Iraq Under-23 National Team
Ahmed Ibrahim was part of the squad that went to Brazil in the summer of 2016 for the Rio Olympics and was one of Iraq's standout players as his defending helped hold a Brazil team featuring Neymar, Gabriel Jesus, Marquinhos and Gabriel Barbosa to a 0-0 draw. Iraq only conceded one goal in the Olympics and despite being knocked out after the group stages, went out undefeated.

Iraq national football team goals
Scores and results list Iraq's goal tally first.

Honors

Club
Erbil SC
 Iraqi Premier League: 2011–12
 AFC Cup runner-up: 2012
Al-Quwa Al-Jawiya
 Iraqi Premier League: 2020–21
 Iraq FA Cup: 2020–21

International
Iraq U-23
 AFC U-22 Championship: 2013
Iraq
 Arab Nations Cup Bronze medallist: 2012
 WAFF Championship runner-up: 2012
 Arabian Gulf Cup runner-up: 2013
 AFC Asian Cup fourth-place: 2015

Individual
 Soccer Iraq Team of the Decade: 2010–2019

See also
 List of men's footballers with 100 or more international caps

References

External links
 Profile on goalzz.com
 
 

1992 births
Living people
Iraqi footballers
Iraq international footballers
2011 AFC Asian Cup players
2015 AFC Asian Cup players
2019 AFC Asian Cup players
Erbil SC players
Al-Wasl F.C. players
Iraqi expatriate footballers
Expatriate footballers in the United Arab Emirates
Iraqi expatriate sportspeople in the United Arab Emirates
Expatriate footballers in Saudi Arabia
Iraqi expatriate sportspeople in Saudi Arabia
Expatriate footballers in Qatar
Iraqi expatriate sportspeople in Qatar
Ajman Club players
Al Dhafra FC players
Emirates Club players
Al-Arabi SC (Qatar) players
Al-Shorta SC players
Ettifaq FC players
UAE Pro League players
Saudi Professional League players
Qatar Stars League players
People from Saladin Governorate
Association football defenders
Footballers at the 2016 Summer Olympics
Olympic footballers of Iraq
FIFA Century Club